There are three types of color mixing: additive, subtractive, and average. In first two cases, mixing is typically described in terms of three primary colors and three secondary colors (colors made by mixing two of the three primary colors in equal amounts). Subtractive mixing with all three primaries will result in black, while additive mixing with all three primaries will result in white.

Additive mixing

The additive mixing of colors is not commonly taught to children, as it does not correspond to the mixing of physical substances (such as paint) which would correspond to subtractive mixing.  Two beams of light that are superimposed mix their colors additively.

By convention, the three primary colors in additive mixing are red, green, and blue. In the absence of light of any color, the result is black. If all three primary colors of light are mixed in equal proportions, the result is neutral (gray or white). When the red and green lights mix, the result is yellow. When green and blue lights mix, the result is cyan. When the blue and red lights mix, the result is magenta.

Red-green–blue additive mixing is used in television and computer monitors, including smartphone displays, to produce a wide range of colors. A screen pixel uses a juxtaposition of these three primary colors. Projection televisions sometimes have three projectors, one for each primary color.

Subtractive mixing

The mixing of colored physical substances corresponds to subtractive color mixing, hence it corresponds to our intuition about mixing colors. To explain the mechanism, consider paint. Red paint is red because, when the ambient light strikes it, the composition of the material is such that it absorbs all other colors in the visible spectrum except for red. The red light, not being absorbed, is reflected by the paint and seen by our eyes. This same mechanism describes the color of material objects – note that light is not a material object – and so applies to the yellow paint as well. Making recourse to the figure above demonstrating additive color mixing, one sees that yellow light is composed of an (additive) mixture of red and green light. When we mix the two paints, the resulting substance has red paint and yellow paint. The yellow paint absorbs all colors except for red and green. However, the red paint will absorb the green reflected by the yellow paint. The red paint can be said to subtract the green from the yellow paint. The resulting paint reflects only red light and so appears red to our eyes. Note however that this description is theoretical and that the mixing of pigments does not correspond to ideal subtractive color mixing because some light from the subtracted color is still being reflected by one component of the original paint. This results in a darker and desaturated color compared to the color that would be achieved with ideal filters.

The three primary colors typically used in subtractive color mixing systems are cyan, magenta, and yellow, corresponding to the CMY color model and CMYK color model widely used in color printing. In subtractive mixing of color, the absence of color is white and the presence of all three primary colors makes a neutral dark gray or black. The secondary colors are the same as the primary colors from additive mixing and vice versa.  Subtractive mixing is used to create a variety of colors when printing or painting on paper or other white substrates, by combining a small number of ink or paint colors. Red is created by mixing magenta and yellow (removing green and blue). Green is created by mixing cyan and yellow (removing red and blue respectively). Blue is created by mixing cyan and magenta (removing red and green). Black can be approximated by mixing cyan, magenta, and yellow, although real pigments are not ideal and so pure black is nearly impossible to achieve.

Average mixing
Average mixing obtains a new color out of two component colors, with brightness equal to the average of the two components. This is different from additive mixing, which results in a color lighter than the colors being mixed; and from subtractive mixing, which results in a color darker than the colors being mixed. Some examples of average mixing are: black and white averages to gray, and blue and red averages to purple. Average mixing has eight primary colors: white, cyan, magenta, yellow, red, green, blue, and black, and a maximum of four of those colors would be needed to archive a particular color, for example, using two colors that are part of a color wheel, along with white and black.

Another example of average mixing is different colors on a disk, which results in an average color when the disk spins fast enough.

Average mixing can be confused with subtractive mixing. For example, even though red and blue averages to purple, an attempt to make a particular shade of purple by mixing red and blue paint may fail, since there is no purple spectrum between the red and blue spectra.

In some case, paint mixing can result in average wavelength. For example, mixing blue and yellow usually results in some shade of green despite them being complementary colors, because there is a green spectrum between yellow spectrum and blue spectrum. It's also one reason why mixing red and blue along with white can result in gray, because red and blue averages to purple, but the average wavelength is green which is a complementary color of purple.

See also
Additive color
Color theory
Impossible colors
Subtractive color

References

Macaulay, David and Neil Ardley (1988). The New Way Things Work. London: Dorling Kindersley Ltd. .

Color
Light